Carlin–type gold deposits are sediment-hosted disseminated gold deposits. These deposits are characterized by invisible (typically microscopic and/or dissolved) gold  in arsenic rich pyrite and arsenopyrite. This dissolved kind of gold is called "Invisible Gold", as it can only be found through chemical analysis. The deposit is named after the Carlin mine, the first large deposit of this type discovered in the Carlin Trend, Nevada.

Geology
The Carlin type deposits show enrichment in the elements gold, arsenic, antimony, mercury, thallium and barium. This enrichment is created by hydrothermal circulation with a temperature of up to 300 °C. The underlying rocks out of which the minerals are dissolved are normally silty carbonates, although also silicates and other sediments are possible. The source of the heating for the water in the hydrothermal circulation is still under discussion.  The material in the deposit is altered in a way that the carbonate minerals are either dissolved or converted to the silicates by silicate rich hydrothermal water. For example, dolomite is transformed into jasperoid. Another alteration is the formation of clay minerals by interaction of water and feldspar. The absence of base metal sulfides and the even distribution of the pyrite and arsenopyrite in the host rock are the most obvious difference to other sulfide deposits.

Mining
The Carlin–type deposits represent some of the largest hydrothermal gold deposits in the world. The invisible nature of the gold in the deposit makes it difficult to find deposits of that kind. The class of deposit was defined after the Carlin mine became a mass producer of gold in the 1960s and it was recognized that other deposits of that type should exist. Most of the mines in the Great Basin in the United States belong to the Carlin type. Similar "Invisible Gold" deposits have also been found in northern Canada, China, Iran, and Macedonia; but the relationship between these deposits and those in Nevada are debated.

See also
Gold mining in Nevada

References

External links
 "The Rush to Uncover Gold’s Origins", Geotimes, April 2006

Economic geology
Ore deposits
Gold mining